Vernharð Þorleifsson (born 1 August 1973) is an Icelandic judoka. He competed in the men's half-heavyweight event at the 1996 Summer Olympics.

References

1973 births
Living people
Vernhard Thorleifsson
Vernhard Thorleifsson
Judoka at the 1996 Summer Olympics
Place of birth missing (living people)